Genki (written: 元気, 元喜, 元基, 元規, 源気 or 源基) is a masculine Japanese given name. Notable people with the name include:

, Japanese lawyer, bureaucrat and politician
, Japanese sumo wrestler
Genki Dean (born 1991), Japanese javelin thrower
, Japanese footballer
, Japanese singer
, Japanese professional wrestler
, Japanese swimmer
, Japanese footballer
, Japanese voice actor
, Japanese footballer
, Japanese footballer
, Japanese actor and voice actor
, Japanese footballer
, Japanese mixed martial artist and kickboxer
, Japanese footballer
, Japanese cyclist

Japanese masculine given names